Leopold König (born 15 November 1987) is a Czech former professional road cyclist, who rode professionally between 2006 and 2019 for the , ,  and  teams. Since retiring, he has acted as the race director for the Czech Cycling Tour and the Course de la Paix U23 – Grand Prix Jeseníky.

Career

Early career

Team NetApp (2011–2014)

König was a stage winner in Caerphilly in September 2012 at the Tour of Britain and in May 2013, he won the queen stage of the Tour of California finishing atop Mount Diablo. König detached himself from a small group in the final kilometers and caught Janier Acevedo, dropping him with only  to go.

However both these wins were eclipsed in August 2013 when he claimed his team's maiden Grand Tour victory by winning a mountain stage to Alto Peñas Blancas in the Vuelta a España after catching climber Igor Antón in the final 500 metres.

König took part in his first Tour de France in 2014, finishing seventh overall after rising two places from ninth by placing fifth in the final time trial.

Team Sky (2015–2016)
König achieved his first podium place for the team, scoring third place at the Trofeo Serra de Tramuntana. In the Giro d'Italia, he took over the leadership role as his leader Richie Porte suffered a massive loss of time and ultimately withdrew. On Stage 16 featuring the Mortirolo Pass, König was docked 10 seconds for holding onto cars. König performed well in the final stages but not well enough to secure a top 5 finish, finishing 6th overall.

Bora–Hansgrohe (2017–2019)
In the first half of the 2017 season, König only competed in two races due to injury.

Major results
Source: 

2005
 7th Overall Giro della Lunigiana
2007
 9th Overall Okolo Slovenska
2009
 6th Grand Prix Kooperativa
 9th Grand Prix Boka
2010
 1st  Overall Oberösterreich Rundfahrt
1st Stage 1
 1st  Overall Czech Cycling Tour
1st Stage 2
 1st Stage 3 Tour of Bulgaria
 3rd Time trial, National Road Championships
 3rd Prague–Karlovy Vary–Prague
 5th Overall Szlakiem Grodów Piastowskich
2011
 2nd Road race, National Road Championships
 2nd Overall Tour of Austria
1st  Young rider classification
 3rd Overall Tour de l'Ain
 9th Overall Tour of Britain
2012
 1st Stage 2b (TTT) Settimana Internazionale di Coppi e Bartali
 3rd Overall Tour of Utah
 6th Grand Prix of Aargau Canton
 10th Overall Tour of Britain
1st Stage 6
2013
 1st  Overall Czech Cycling Tour
1st Stage 3
 1st Stage 7 Tour of California
 6th Overall Settimana Internazionale di Coppi e Bartali
 9th Overall Vuelta a España
1st Stage 8
2014
 4th Overall Bayern–Rundfahrt
 7th Overall Tour de France
2015
 National Road Championships
2nd Road race
2nd Time trial
 3rd Overall Giro del Trentino
 3rd Trofeo Serra de Tramuntana
 5th Trofeo Andratx-Mirador d'Es Colomer
 6th Overall Giro d'Italia
 8th Overall Abu Dhabi Tour
 10th Overall Czech Cycling Tour
1st Stage 3
2016
 1st  Time trial, National Road Championships
 1st Stage 1 (TTT) Vuelta a España
 9th Trofeo Pollenca-Port de Andratx
 10th Overall Volta a la Comunitat Valenciana

Grand Tour general classification results timeline

References

External links

1987 births
Living people
Czech male cyclists
Czech Vuelta a España stage winners
People from Moravská Třebová
Cyclists at the 2016 Summer Olympics
Olympic cyclists of the Czech Republic
Sportspeople from the Pardubice Region